Satriyo Rahadhani (born September 17, 1981 in Surabaya) is an Indonesian taekwondo practitioner, who competed in the men's flyweight category. He claimed a silver medal in the 58-kg division, as a 17-year-old teen, at the 1998 Asian Games in Bangkok, Thailand, and became the first Indonesian male taekwondo fighter to mark an Olympic debut in the sport at the 2004 Summer Olympics.

Rahadhani qualified for the Indonesian squad in the men's flyweight class (58 kg) at the 2004 Summer Olympics in Athens, by granting a berth and placing fifth from the Asian Olympic Qualifying Tournament in Bangkok, Thailand. Rahadhani crashed out in a tight 5–6 defeat to British taekwondo fighter and 2003 World silver medalist Paul Green in the opening round. With Green losing the quarterfinals to Vietnam's Nguyen Quoc Huan, Rahadhani denied his chance to compete for an Olympic bronze medal in the repechage.

References

External links

1981 births
Living people
Indonesian male taekwondo practitioners
Olympic taekwondo practitioners of Indonesia
Taekwondo practitioners at the 2004 Summer Olympics
Taekwondo practitioners at the 1998 Asian Games
Taekwondo practitioners at the 2002 Asian Games
Asian Games medalists in taekwondo
Sportspeople from Surabaya
Asian Games silver medalists for Indonesia
Medalists at the 1998 Asian Games
Southeast Asian Games silver medalists for Indonesia
Southeast Asian Games medalists in taekwondo
Competitors at the 2001 Southeast Asian Games
Asian Taekwondo Championships medalists
21st-century Indonesian people